The Surtees Rail Group is a South African railway company. It was founded in 1950 by Arthur Surtees manufacturing, repairing and supplying steam locomotive and hopper equipment and parts for the industrial rail road industry in Southern Africa. With the introduction of diesel hydraulic and diesel electric locomotives in the early 1960s it also began to import, manufacture and stock equipment and parts for these locomotives.

African Rail & Traction Services
African Rail & Traction Services (ARTS) specialises in the purchase, overhaul and lease of locomotives, trackmobiles and other rolling stock. It operates out of a workshop complex in Pretoria. It owns and hires out its own fleet of tractive power which consists of in the main, Electro-Motive Diesel, General Electric, Hunslet and Funkey locomotives. It has purchased locomotives from as far afield as Australia.

References

Locomotive manufacturers of South Africa
Railway companies of South Africa
Rolling stock leasing companies
1950 establishments in South Africa
Companies based in Johannesburg